Dieter Kürten (born 23 April 1935 in Duisburg) is a German sports journalist.

Life 
Kürten worked from 1967 to 2000 for sport magazine das aktuelle sportstudio at German broadcaster ZDF. Kürten is married and has three children.

Awards 
 1979 – Goldener Gong for Länderspiel: Bundesrepublik–Argentinien
 1981 – Goldene Kamera in category sportjournalist

External links 
 

German sports journalists
German sports broadcasters
German male journalists
1935 births
Living people
German male writers
ZDF people